Polloch is a remote hamlet, located at the north shore of the River Polloch, in an inlet that flows into Loch Shiel, in Inverness-shire, Scottish Highlands and is in the Scottish council area of Highland.

Populated places in Lochaber